Mu Hong (born December 1956) is a Chinese economist and official, serving since 2014 as the executive deputy director of the Office of Deepening Reform (minister-level), and since 2007 as a deputy director of the National Development and Reform Commission.

Chen was born in Dalian, Liaoning province. He graduated with a degree in finance from Central University of Finance and Economics.  He began his administrative career in the National Planning Commission, then was elevated to a department chief position in the National Development and Reform Commission (NDRC).  He later served as the assistant to the Chairman, then Vice Chairman (governor) of the Guangxi Zhuang Autonomous Region, while concurrently serving as the head of the autonomous region's Development and Reform Commission. In December 2007, he was named deputy director of the NDRC.

References

1956 births
Living people
People's Republic of China politicians from Liaoning
Chinese Communist Party politicians from Liaoning
Politicians from Dalian
Central University of Finance and Economics alumni
Members of the 19th Central Committee of the Chinese Communist Party